Slidell  is a city on the northeast shore of Lake Pontchartrain in St. Tammany Parish, Louisiana, United States. The population was 28,781 at the 2020 census. It is part of the New Orleans−Metairie−Kenner metropolitan statistical area.

History

Beginning
One of the earlier settlers to the area was Foster Willie. Along with a younger brother, Wesley Coke Asbury Gause, Judge Wingate, and several others, he left Shallotte, North Carolina, on February 18, and arrived at Pearlington, Mississippi, on April 14, 1836. Wesley and his family remained there, while John and family crossed the Pearl River and built a log cabin on the west bank, a little further south. He then began a lumber mill in the fledgling town later known as Slidell. His traveling back and forth from lumber yard to home created a road known today as Gause Boulevard, a major east–west street in the town. The lumber yard was where Gause Boulevard crosses the railroad track. The log cabin was built at the east end of the road, just a few yards from the river. The house stood until the late 1990s, and a small family burial plot still remains where John is buried between his two wives, Lydia Russ and Johanna Frederica VanHeemskerk.

Slidell was founded on the north shore of Lake Pontchartrain in 1882 and 1883 during construction of the New Orleans and Northeastern Railroad (N.O.N.E.). The N.O.N.E. line connected New Orleans to Meridian, Mississippi. The town was named in honor of American politician and Confederate ambassador to France John Slidell, and officially chartered by the Louisiana State Legislature in 1888.

20th century and beyond
Around 1910, Slidell began a period of economic and industrial growth. A large creosote plant was built, and Slidell became home to the Fritz Salmen Brickyard, a major producer of bricks later named St. Joe Brick. A lumber mill and shipyard were also built. Following the construction of Interstate 10, Interstate 59, and Interstate 12, Slidell became a major crossroads for those traversing the Gulf States.

In 1915, the creosote plant burned to the ground. The plant was rebuilt on Bayou Lane, closer to a water source and a fire station. Eventually, creosote polluted the bayou, a source of drinking water for many of Slidell's residents. The creosote plant was abandoned in 1986 and became an EPA Superfund site. The canal was dredged and waste incinerated until completion of the cleanup in the 1990s. At that time a boat launch was built and Heritage Park was constructed on the former site.

With the advent of the U.S. space program in the 1960s, NASA opened the Michoud Assembly Facility in New Orleans, the John C. Stennis Space Center in nearby Bay St. Louis, Mississippi, and a NASA computer center on Gause Boulevard. This nearly tripled Slidell's population over ten years, and the city became a major suburb of New Orleans. The National Weather Service forecast office for the New Orleans and Baton Rouge area is also in Slidell. Slidell is the headquarters of Vesco Tennis Courts, a privately held firm specializing in construction of hard surfaces for outdoor sports facilities.

The city has hosted several parade krewes each Carnival season.

On August 29, 2005, Slidell suffered extensive damage from Hurricane Katrina, as the storm made final landfall on the morning of August 29, 2005.

Slidell Museum 
The Slidell Museum is a small museum that highlights the founding of the city as a railroad town. Located in Olde Town Slidell on 1st Street, the museum is open Tuesday through Saturday. Admission is free to the public.

Geography
The city forms part of the Greater New Orleans area.

Climate
Slidell has a humid subtropical climate, with short, generally mild winters (slightly cooler than the southshore part of the New Orleans area) and hot, humid summers. Precipitation in winter usually accompanies the passage of a cold front. Hurricanes pose a threat to the area, and the city is vulnerable because of its low elevation.

Demographics

As of the 2020 United States census, there were 28,781 people, 9,818 households, and 6,430 families residing in the city. At the 2010 United States census, 27,068 people, 10,050 households, and 7,145 families resided in Slidell. In 2000, the population was 25,695.

Per to the 2019 American Community Survey, the U.S. Census Bureau estimated the racial and ethnic makeup of the city as 71.8% non-Hispanic white, 16.9% Black and African American, 0.5% American Indian and Alaska Native, 1.3% Asian, 0.1% some other race, 2.3% two or more races, and 7.1% Hispanic and Latin American of any race. In 2010, the racial makeup of the city was 76.0% White, 17.0% Black and African American, 0.5% Native American, 1.6% Asian, 0.0% Pacific Islander, 2.7% from other races, and 2.3% from two or more races. Hispanics and Latin Americans of any race were 6.3% of the population. At the 2000 U.S. census, the racial and ethnic makeup of the city was 83.13% White, 13.56% African American, 0.49% Native American, 0.72% Asian, 0.05% Pacific Islander, 0.62% from other races, and 1.43% from two or more races; Hispanics and Latin Americans of any race were 2.67% of the population.

Of the population in 2019, the median age was 36.7 and 73.2% of the population were aged 18 and older; an estimated 15.9% of the population were aged 65 and older. Residents of Slidell had a median household income of $54,906 and 15.1% of the population lived at or below the poverty line. Males had a median full-time annual income of $54,642 versus $37,183 for females. Of the 10,050 households in 2010, 31.6% had children under the age of 18 living with them, 48.9% were married couples living together, 16.2% had a female householder with no husband present, and 28.9% were non-families. 23.4% of households were one person and 9.4% were one person aged 65 or older. The average household size was 2.66 and the average family size was 3.13. In 2010, the age distribution was 28.0% under the age of 19, 6% from 20 to 24, 26% from 25 to 44, 26.1% from 45 to 64, and 14% 65 or older. The median age was 37.3 years. For every 100 females, there were 94.1 males.

Economy
Slidell is the global headquarters for automotive manufacturer and military contractor Textron Marine & Land Systems off Gause Boulevard.

Education
Slidell's public schools are operated by the St. Tammany Parish Public Schools. There are three public high schools in Slidell: Northshore High School; Salmen High School; and Slidell High School; and two private high schools: Pope John Paul II High School and First Baptist Christian School.

Northshore Technical Community College has its main campus in Lacombe; this campus was established in January 2017. Additionally, Nunez Community College in Chalmette and the Sidney Collier Campus of Delgado Community College in New Orleans East are in proximity to the parish.

Previously the Slidell Learning Center and later the Northshore-Slidell campus, and with Covington having the Northshore-Covington Campus. The latter opened in summer 2002. The Slidell campus closed in 2016 due to financial issues.

Transportation

Amtrak’s Crescent serves Slidell station, and offers service to New York City, Washington, D.C., Atlanta, Birmingham, New Orleans, and intermediate points. The station is located on Front Street in Olde Towne Slidell.

Slidell is on the southwest corner of the intersection of Interstate 10, Interstate 12, Interstate 59, and U.S. Highway 11. The I-10 Twin Span Bridge runs from Slidell to New Orleans East across Lake Pontchartrain.

Slidell Airport (ICAO: KASD, FAA LID: ASD) is a city-owned public-use airport four nautical miles (7 km) northwest of Slidell's central business district. Although most U.S. airports use the same three-letter location identifier for the FAA and IATA, Slidell's is assigned ASD by the FAA but has no designation from the IATA (which assigned ASD to Andros Town Airport in the Bahamas).

Notable people
John Besh, chef and owner of Restaurant August and Luke; finalist on the Food Network show Iron Chef America 
Clarence "Gatemouth" Brown, Grammy Award-winning instrumentalist 
P. J. Brown, NBA player
Tony Canzoneri, world boxing champion 
Arthur Chevrolet, co-founder of the automobile company that bears his name and participant in the inaugural Indianapolis 500
Rich Clementi, mixed martial arts fighter and UFC and Bellator MMA veteran who trains and resides in Slidell 
Chris Duhon, former Duke University and NBA point guard; played basketball at Salmen High School 
Mike Fontenot, MLB infielder; played at Salmen High School and LSU
Matt Forte, NFL running back; played at Tulane University in New Orleans and at Slidell High School
Will Harris, MLB pitcher, former LSU infielder, played baseball at Slidell High School. 
Rodney Holman, former tight end for Cincinnati Bengals and Detroit Lions
Arthur Jones, inventor, TV producer, adventurer and animal trapper. 
Juvenile, Southern rapper 
LaRon Landry, strong safety for the Washington Commanders and LSU
Paul Mauffray, conductor
Logan Morrison, former outfielder for the Seattle Mariners, Miami Marlins, and Tampa Bay Rays, currently in the Philadelphia Phillies organization; played baseball at Northshore High School 
Xavier Paul, former outfielder for seven MLB teams, most recently with the Philadelphia Phillies

References

External links

 City of Slidell official website
 Northshore Deals website
 Homes For Sale In Slidell
 St. Petersburg Times Travel article
 Photographs of Hurricane Katrina's destruction in Slidell

 
Cities in St. Tammany Parish, Louisiana
Cities in Louisiana
Cities in the New Orleans metropolitan area
Populated places established in 1882
Populated coastal places in Louisiana